Dichomeris okadai is a moth in the family Gelechiidae. It was described by Sigeru Moriuti in 1982. It is found in south-eastern Siberia, Shaanxi in China and Honshu in Japan.

References

Moths described in 1982
okadai